Anastasios ("Tasos") Kourakis (1948 − 10 October 2021) was a Greek pediatrician, geneticist and politician of the Coalition of the Radical Left (Syriza). From January 2015 until July 2019 he served as Alternate Minister of Education.

Biography
Born 1948 in Thessaloniki, Kourakis studied medicine at Aristotle University of Thessaloniki. He has been an Associate Professor of Genetics in the Faculty of Medicine of Aristotle University.

In 2002 and 2006, he was elected a member of the municipal council of Thessaloniki heading his list. From 2007 on, Kourakis has been a Member of the Hellenic Parliament for Thessaloniki A on Syriza's list.

Following the June 2012 elections, together with Theano Fotiou he was nominated for the post of education minister in Syriza's Shadow Cabinet of Alexis Tsipras. After the January 2015 legislative election, Kourakis was appointed Alternate Minister of Education.

He died of cancer at the age of 73, on 10 October 2021.

References

External links
  
 

1948 births
2021 deaths
Aristotle University of Thessaloniki alumni
Greek pediatricians
Greek geneticists
Academic staff of the Aristotle University of Thessaloniki
Politicians from Thessaloniki
Syriza politicians
Greek MPs 2007–2009
Greek MPs 2009–2012
Greek MPs 2012 (May)
Greek MPs 2012–2014
Greek MPs 2015 (February–August)
MPs of Thessaloniki
Government ministers of Greece
Greek MPs 2015–2019
People in health professions from Thessaloniki